Mununga is a settlement in Kenya's Central Province.

References 

Mununga is in central kenya muranga county kigumo constituency in kinyona location. Mununga is a kikuyu name meaning smelling place. mununga was known as Gitegenye but later in 1950s got its name 'mununga' from foul smell of unburied  decomposing bodies of british resistance whom met their terrible death in the hands of chief Njiiri; a royal and right man to the British empire who fought resistance with all forces in his disposal. Mununga was one of rebellions' bedroom  WHERE it is believed most of MAU MAU generals had hold their warfare meeting before  hiding their skin back in the Aberdare forest.

Mununga is made up of villages like Kamahiga, Mahehe, Mukoma Gathaiti, Muchagatha and Kariti. its one of the town that MauMau road have slashed through making it a fast growing town in Muranga county. 
Irati river, Gitaigua and Maragua serves Mununga with pure mineral water from the mountain of Aberdare. Gacharage tea factory is also located in mununga.

Populated places in Central Province (Kenya)